Varetto is an Italian surname. Notable people with the surname include:

Angelo Varetto (1910–2001), Italian cyclist
Carlo Varetto (1905–1966), Italian Olympic shooter
Sergio Varetto (1937–1981), Italian Olympic shooter, son of Carlo

Italian-language surnames